Arlind Kalaja (born 27 December 1995) is an Albanian professional footballer who plays as a winger for Swedish club Ljungskile in the Ettan.

Club career

Vllaznia Shkodër
Kalaja was promoted to Vllaznia's senior squad during the 2012–13 season, making his professional debut on 27 April 2013 by playing in the second half of the match lost at the hands of Besa Kavajë.

Later in the next season, Kalaja did not play any match, featuring only once as an unused substitute in the 1–1 draw versus Tirana at Qemal Stafa Stadium.

In March 2015, Kalaja underwent surgery on his anterior cruciate ligament (ACL) by doctor Fausto Zanelli. He remained sidelined for the next five months, only returning in action at the end of September, playing as substitute in the 1–0 home loss to Laçi in the 2015–16 Albanian Superliga matchday 5.

On 26 July 2017, Kalaja agreed another contract extension, signing for the upcoming season.

In the 2017–18 season, he made 30 league appearances, starting only 7, collecting 973 minutes, scoring 4 goals as Vllaznia was relegated for the first time in 60 years. He went on saying that he was "persecuted" within the group, adding that he was left aside and was not given regular playing time.

On 3 June 2018, Kalaja announced his departure from the club once his contract expired, finishing his spell with more than 100 appearances in all competitions.

Kukësi
On 6 June 2018, Kalaja agreed personal terms and completed a transfer to Kukësi, penning a contract until June 2020.

On 31 January 2019, on deadline day, Kalaja was loaned to Kastrioti Krujë until the end of 2018–19 season.

Teuta Durrës
Ahead of the 2019/20 season, Kalaja joined KF Teuta Durrës on a two-year deal.

International career
Kalaja has been a former Albania youth international, representing his country at under-15, -17 and -19 level.

Career statistics

References

External links
Arlind Kalaja at the Albanian Football Association

1995 births
Living people
Footballers from Shkodër
Albanian footballers
Albania youth international footballers
Association football midfielders
KF Vllaznia Shkodër players
FK Kukësi players
KS Kastrioti players
KF Teuta Durrës players
Kategoria Superiore players